Paris–Roubaix is a one-day professional bicycle road race in northern France, starting north of Paris and finishing in Roubaix, at the border with Belgium. It is one of cycling's oldest races, and is one of the 'Monuments' or classics of the European calendar, and contributes points towards the UCI World Ranking. The most recent edition was held on 17 April 2022.

Paris–Roubaix is famous for rough terrain and cobblestones, or pavé (setts), being, with the Tour of Flanders, E3 Harelbeke and Gent–Wevelgem, one of the cobbled classics. It has been called the Hell of the North, a Sunday in Hell (also the title of a film about the 1976 race), the Queen of the Classics or la Pascale: the Easter race. Since 1977, the winner of Paris–Roubaix has received a sett (cobble stone) as part of his prize.

The terrain has led to the development of specialised frames, wheels and tyres. Punctures and other mechanical problems are common and often influence the result. Despite the esteem of the race, some cyclists dismiss it because of its difficult conditions. The race has also seen several controversies, with winners disqualified.

Since 1943, the finish has for the most part taken place in the Roubaix Velodrome. The race is organised by the media group Amaury Sport Organisation annually in mid-April.

The course is maintained by Les Amis de Paris–Roubaix, a group of fans of the race formed in 1983. The forçats du pavé seek to keep the course safe for riders while maintaining its difficulty.  Other than during the world wars and, in 2020, during the coronavirus pandemic (the April 2021 race was postponed to October), it has taken place every year from its inception.

History

Paris–Roubaix is one of the oldest races of professional road cycling. It was first run in 1896 and has stopped only for the two world wars and the COVID-19 pandemic. The race was created by two Roubaix textile manufacturers, Théodore Vienne (born 28 July 1864) and Maurice Perez. They had been behind the building of a velodrome on 46,000 square metres at the corner of the rue Verte and the route d'Hempempont, which opened on 9 June 1895.

Vienne and Perez held several meetings on the track, one including the first appearance in France by the American sprinter Major Taylor, and then looked for further ideas. In February 1896 they hit on the idea of holding a race from Paris to their track. This presented two problems. The first was that the biggest races started or ended in Paris and that Roubaix might be too provincial a destination. The second was that they could organize the start or finish but not both.

They spoke to Louis Minart, the editor of Le Vélo, the only French daily sports paper. Minart was enthusiastic but said the decision of whether the paper would organize the start and provide publicity belonged to the director, Paul Rousseau. Minart may also have suggested an indirect approach because the mill owners recommended their race not on its own merits, but as preparation for another. They wrote:

Dear M. Rousseau, Bordeaux–Paris is approaching and this great annual event which has done so much to promote cycling has given us an idea. What would you think of a training race which preceded Bordeaux–Paris by four weeks? The distance between Paris and Roubaix is roughly 280 km, so it would be child's play for the future participants of Bordeaux–Paris. The finish would take place at the Roubaix vélodrome after several laps of the track. Everyone would be assured of an enthusiastic welcome as most of our citizens have never had the privilege of seeing the spectacle of a major road race and we count on enough friends to believe that Roubaix is truly a hospitable town. As prizes we already have subscribed to a first prize of 1,000 francs in the name of the Roubaix velodrome and we will be busy establishing a generous prize list which will be to the satisfaction of all. But for the moment, can we count on the patronage of Le Vélo and on your support for organising the start?

The proposed first prize represented seven months' wages for a miner at the time.

Rousseau was enthusiastic and sent his cycling editor, Victor Breyer, to find a route. Breyer travelled to Amiens in a Panhard driven by his colleague, Paul Meyan. The following morning Breyer — later deputy organiser of the Tour de France and a leading official of the Union Cycliste Internationale – continued by bike. The wind blew, the rain fell and the temperature dropped. Breyer reached Roubaix filthy and exhausted after a day of riding on cobbles (setts). He swore he would send a telegram to Minart urging him to drop the idea, saying it was dangerous to send a race the way he had just ridden. But that evening a meal and drinks with the team from Roubaix changed his mind.

Easter mystery
Vienne and Perez scheduled their race for Easter Sunday. The Roman Catholic Church objected to it being held on the most sacred day of the liturgical year, suggesting that riders would not have time to attend mass and that spectators might not bother to attend either. Tracts were distributed in Roubaix decrying the venture.

What happened next is uncertain. Legend says that Vienne and Perez promised a mass would be said for the riders in a chapel 200m from the start, in the boulevard Maillot. This story is repeated by Pascal Sergent, the historian of the race, and by Pierre Chany, historian of the sport in general. Sergent goes as far as saying that Victor Breyer, who he says was there, said the service, scheduled for 4am, was cancelled because it was too early. Neither Chany nor Sergent mentions if the date of the race was subsequently changed, however the first Paris–Roubaix (according to Sergent) was held on 19 April 1896, whereas Easter Sunday in 1896 occurred two weeks earlier, on 5 April.

The first Paris–Roubaix on Easter Sunday was the next year, 1897.

The first race

News of Breyer's ride to Roubaix may have spread. Half those who entered did not turn up at the Brassérie de l'Espérance, the race headquarters at the start. Those who dropped out before the race began included Henri Desgrange, a prominent track rider who went on to organize the Tour de France. The starters did include Maurice Garin, who went on to win Desgrange's first Tour and was the local hope in Roubaix because he and two brothers had opened a cycle shop in the boulevard de Paris the previous year.

Garin came third, 15 minutes behind Josef Fischer, the only German to have won the race until 2015. Only four finished within an hour of the winner. Garin would have come second had he not been knocked over by a crash between two tandems, one of them ridden by his pacers. Garin "finished exhausted and Dr Butrille was obliged to attend the man who had been run over by two machines", said Sergent.

The second race

Garin won the following year, beating Dutchman Mathieu Cordang in the last two kilometres of the velodrome at Roubaix. Sergent said:

As the two champions appeared they were greeted by a frenzy of excitement and everyone was on their feet to acclaim the two heroes. It was difficult to recognise them. Garin was first, followed by the mud-soaked figure of Cordang. Suddenly, to the stupefaction of everyone, Cordang slipped and fell on the velodrome's cement surface. Garin could not believe his luck. By the time Cordang was back on his bike, he had lost 100 metres. There remained six laps to cover. Two miserable kilometres in which to catch Garin. The crowd held its breath as they watched the incredible pursuit match. The bell rang out. One lap, there remained one lap. 333 metres for Garin, who had a lead of 30 metres on the Batave.

A classic victory was within his grasp but he could almost feel his adversary's breath on his neck. Somehow Garin held on to his lead of two metres, two little metres for a legendary victory. The stands exploded and the ovation united the two men. Garin exulted under the cheers of the crowd. Cordang cried bitter tears of disappointment.

Hell of the North
The race usually leaves riders caked in mud and grit, from the cobbled roads and rutted tracks of northern France's former coal-mining region. However, this is not how this race earned the name l'enfer du Nord, or Hell of the North. The term was used to describe the route of the race after World War I. Organisers and journalists set off from Paris in 1919 to see how much of the route had survived four years of shelling and trench warfare. Procycling reported:

They knew little of the permanent effects of the war. Nine million had died and France lost more than any. But, as elsewhere, news was scant. Who even knew if there was still a road to Roubaix? If Roubaix was still there? The car of organisers and journalists made its way along the route those first riders had gone. And at first all looked well. There was destruction and there was poverty and there was a strange shortage of men. But France had survived. But then, as they neared the north, the air began to reek of broken drains, raw sewage and the stench of rotting cattle. Trees which had begun to look forward to spring became instead blackened, ragged stumps, their twisted branches pushed to the sky like the crippled arms of a dying man. Everywhere was mud. Nobody knows who first described it as 'hell', but there was no better word. And that's how it appeared next day in the papers: that little party had seen 'the hell of the north.'

The words in L'Auto were:

We enter into the centre of the battlefield. There's not a tree, everything is flattened! Not a square metre that has not been hurled upside down. There's one shell hole after another. The only things that stand out in this churned earth are the crosses with their ribbons in blue, white and red. It is hell! '

History of the cobbles

Seeking the challenge of racing on cobbles is relatively recent. It began at the same time in Paris–Roubaix and the Tour of Flanders, when widespread improvements to roads after the second world war brought realisation that the character of both races were changing. Until then the race had been over cobbles not because they were bad but because that was how roads were made. André Mahé, who won in 1949 (see below Controversies), said:

After the war, of course, the roads were all bad. There were cobbles from the moment you left Paris, or Senlis where we started in those days. There'd be stretches of surfaced roads and often there'd be a cycle path or a pavement and sometimes a thin stretch of something smoother. But you never knew where was best to ride and you were for ever switching about. You could jump your bike up on to a pavement but that got harder the more tired you got. Then you'd get your front wheel up but not your back wheel. That happened to me. And then you'd go sprawling, of course, and you could bring other riders down. Or they'd fall off and bring you down with them. And the cycle paths were often just compressed cinders, which got soft in the rain and got churned up by so many riders using them and then you got stuck and you lost your balance. And come what may, you got covered in coal dust and other muck. No, it's all changed and you can't compare then and now.

The coming of live television prompted mayors along the route to surface their cobbled roads for fear the rest of France would see them as backward and not invested in the region. Albert Bouvet, the organiser, said: "If things don't change, we'll soon be calling it Paris–Valenciennes", reference to a flat race on good roads that often ends in a mass sprint. L'Équipe said: "The riders don't deserve that." Its editor, Jacques Goddet, called Paris–Roubaix "the last great madness of cycling." Bouvet and Jean-Claude Vallaeys formed Les Amis de Paris–Roubaix (see below). Its president, Alain Bernard, led enthusiasts to look for and sometimes maintain obscure cobbled paths. He said:

It was Alain Bernard who found one of the race's most significant cobbled stretches, the Carrefour de l'Arbre. He was out on a Sunday ride, turned off the main road to see what was there and found the last bad cobbles before the finish. It is a bleak area with just a bar by the crossroads. Bernard said:

The Amis de Paris–Roubaix spend €10–15,000 a year on restoring and rebuilding cobbles. The Amis supply the sand and other material and the repairs are made as training by students from horticulture schools at Dunkirk, Lomme, Raismes and Douai. Each section costs €4–6,000, paid for equally by the Amis, the organisers and the local commune. Bernard said:

Strategic places of historic races
The strategic places where earlier races could be won or lost include Doullens Hill, Arras, Carvin and the Wattignies bend. Some sections of cobbles have deteriorated beyond the point of safety and repair or have been resurfaced and lost their significance. Other sections are excluded because the route of the race has moved east.

Pacers
Early races were run behind pacers, as were many competitions of the era. The first pacers were other cyclists, on bicycles or tandems. Cars and motorcycles were allowed to pace from 1898. The historian Fer Schroeders says:

In 1898, even cars and motorcycles were allowed to open the road for the competitors. In 1900, the race was within a hair's breadth of disappearing, with only 19 riders at the start. The following year, the organisation therefore decided to allow help only from pacers on bicycles. And in 1910, help from pacers were stopped for good. An option which lifted Paris–Roubaix out of the background and pushed it, in terms of interest, ahead of the prestigious Bordeaux–Paris.

Course

Originally, the race was from Paris to Roubaix, but in 1966 the start moved to Chantilly, 50 km north, then in 1977 to Compiègne, 80 km north.
From Compiègne it now follows a 260 km winding route north to Roubaix, hitting the first cobbles after 100 km. During the last 150 km the cobbles extend more than 50 km. The race culminates with 750m on the smooth concrete of the large outdoor Vélodrome André-Pétrieux in Roubaix. The route is adjusted from year to year as older roads are resurfaced and the organisers seek more cobbles to maintain the character of the race — in 2005, for example, the race included 54.7 km of cobbles.

The start
The race has started at numerous places:

The opening kilometres (the départ fictif) have often been a rolling procession. Racing has started further into the ride (départ réel). The start of open racing has been at:

Main cobbled sectors
The organisers grade the cobbles by length, irregularity, the general condition and their position in the race.

Troisvilles to Inchy

This sector is now usually the first cobbled section, typically about 100 km into the race, and was first used 1987. It is the highest of all the cobbles at 136 m.

Wallers Haveluy
A 2.5 km sector named after Bernard Hinault, the 1981 winner, which also features frequently in the Quatre Jours de Dunkerque race. It starts at 31m and finishes at 34m. It begins with a gentle rise and finishes with a gentle fall.

Trouée d'Arenberg

The Trouée d'Arenberg, Tranchée d'Arenberg, (Trench of Arenberg), Trouee de Wallers Arenberg, has become the symbol of Paris–Roubaix. Officially 'La Drève des Boules d'Herin', the 2400m of cobbles were laid in the time of Napoleon I through the Raismes Forest-Saint-Amand-Wallers, close to Wallers and Valenciennes. The road was proposed for Paris–Roubaix by former professional Jean Stablinski, who had worked in the mine under the woods of Arenberg. The mine closed in 1990 and the passage is now preserved. Although almost 100 km from Roubaix, the sector usually proves decisive and as Stablinski said,
A memorial to Stablinski stands at one end of the road.

Introduced in 1968, the passage was closed from 1974 to 1983 by the Office National des Fôrets. Until 1998 the entry to the Arenberg pavé was slightly downhill, leading to a sprint for best position. The route was reversed in 1999 to reduce the speed. This was as a result of Johan Museeuw's crash in 1998 as World Cup leader, which resulted in gangrene so severe that amputation of his leg was considered. In 2005 the Trouée d'Arenberg was left out, organisers saying conditions had deteriorated beyond safety limits as abandoned mines had caused sections to subside. The regional and local councils spent €250,000 on adding 50 cm to restore the original width of three metres and the race continued using it. The Italian rider Filippo Pozzato said after trying the road after its repairs:
It's the true definition of hell. It's very dangerous, especially in the first kilometre when we enter it at more than 60kh. It's unbelievable. The bike goes in all directions. It will be a real spectacle but I don't know if it's really necessary to impose it on us.

In 2001 a French rider, Philippe Gaumont, broke his femur after falling at the start of the Trouée when leading the peloton. He said:
What I went through, only I will ever know. My knee cap completely turned to the right, a ball of blood forming on my leg and the bone that broke, without being able to move my body. And the pain, a pain that I wouldn't wish on anyone. The surgeon placed a big support [un gros matériel] in my leg, because the bone had moved so much. Breaking a femur is always serious in itself but an open break in an athlete of high level going flat out, that tears the muscles. At 180 beats [a minute of the heart], there was a colossal amount of blood being pumped, which meant my leg was full of blood. I'm just grateful that the artery was untouched.

Gaumont spent a month and a half in bed, unable to move, and was fitted with a 40 mm section fixed just above the knee and, to the head of the femur, with a 12 mm screw.  So many fans have taken away cobbles as souvenirs that the Amis de Paris–Roubaix have had to replace them.

Mons-en-Pévèle
The second of three sectors usually graded as five star difficulty, this 3 km sector includes a 16m rise and 2 right-angled turns. It was first used in 1978 and, as of 2016, has been used every year since except 2001.

Carrefour de l'Arbre
Le Carrefour de l'Arbre (or Pavé de Luchin) is the last section of pavé of the hardest level of difficulty, five stars. The crossroads (carrefour) is on open land between Gruson and Camphin-en-Pévèle. The route departs westward from Camphin-en-Pévèle along the rue de Cysoing towards Camphin de l'Arbre. The first half is a series of corners, then along irregular pavé towards Luchin. The second half finishes at the Café de l'Arbre restaurant and has more even pavé. This 2.1 km sector has often proved decisive due to its proximity to Roubaix (15 km) and cumulative difficulty.

Roubaix, Espace Charles Crupelandt

The final stretch of cobbles before the stadium is named after a local rider, Charles Crupelandt, who won in 1912 and 1914. The organiser of the Tour de France, Henri Desgrange, predicted he would win his race. Crupelandt then went to war and returned a hero, with the Croix de Guerre.

This 300 m sector was created for the centenary event in 1996 by laying a strip of smooth new cobbles down the centre of a wide street. Among the cobbles are plaques to every race winner, giving the road an official name of 'Chemin des Géants,' [Road of the Giants].

The finish

The finish until 1914 was on the original track at Croix, where the Parc clinic now stands. There were then various finish points:

 1896–1914: Rue Verte/route d'Hempempont, Croix, Roubaix
 1919: avenue de Jussieu, Roubaix, behind the dairy
 1920–1921: Stadium Jean Dubrulle, Roubaix
 1922–1928: avenue des Villas (now the avenue Gustave Delory), Roubaix
 1929: Stade Amédée Prouvost, Wattrelos
 1930–1934: avenue des Villas, Roubaix
 1935–1936: Flandres horse track, Marcq
 1937–1939: avenue Gustave Delory (former avenue des Villas), Roubaix
 1943–1985: Roubaix Velodrome
 1986–1988: avenue des Nations-Unies
 1989–present (April 2022): Roubaix Velodrome

The race moved to the current stadium in 1943, and there it has stayed with the exceptions of 1986, 1987 and 1988 when the finish was in the avenue des Nations-Unies, outside the offices of La Redoute, the mail-order company which sponsored the race.

The shower room inside the velodrome is distinctive for the open, three-sided, low-walled concrete stalls, each with a brass plaque to commemorate a winner. These include Peter Van Petegem, Eddy Merckx, Roger De Vlaeminck, Rik Van Looy and Fausto Coppi.

A commemorative plaque at 37 avenue Gustave Delory honours Émile Masson Jr., the last to win there.

Bicycles

Paris–Roubaix presents a technical challenge to riders, team personnel, and equipment. Special frames and wheels are often used. In the past, developments to cope with the demands of Paris–Roubaix have included the use of wider tires, cantilever brakes, and dual brake levers. More recently, manufacturers such as Specialized have developed new types of bike which are designed to cope with the demands on the cobbled classics: the best known being the Specialized Roubaix series, which has a longer wheelbase and is designed to offer the rider a more forgiving ride. Many teams disperse personnel along the course with spare wheels, equipment and bicycles to help in locations not accessible to the team car.

André Mahé, winner in 1948, said such specialisation is recent:

Riders have experimented, however. After the Second World War many tried wooden rims of the sort used at the start of cycle racing. Francesco Moser wrapped his handlebars with strips of foam in the 1970s. Gilbert Duclos-Lassalle and Greg LeMond experimented with suspension in their front forks in the 1990s.

Some top riders receive special frames to give more stability and comfort. Different materials make the ride more comfortable. Tom Boonen, using a Time frame with longer wheelbase for the first time, won the race in 2005 and has since continued to use a bike with a longer wheelbase. George Hincapie had a frame featuring a 2 mm elastomer insert at the top of the seat stays. The manufacturers claimed this took nearly all the shock out of the cobbles. Hincapie's Trek bicycle fared less well in 2006: his aluminum steerer tube snapped with 46 km to go, the crash injuring his shoulder.

Canadian rider Steve Bauer had a frame built by Eddy Merckx Bicycles with extremely slack angles, to the extent of being semi-recumbent.  It was not a success and was only used for one edition of the race.

The bicycle made for Peter Van Petegem in 2004 was a Time. The distance from bottom bracket to rear axle was 419 mm rather than his normal 403. The distance from the bottom bracket to the front hub was 605 mm instead of 600 mm. The depth of the front forks was 372 mm instead of 367.5 mm The forks were spaced to take 28 mm tyres. The sprockets were steel rather than alloy and the steerer column was cut 5 mm higher than usual to raise the handlebars if needed before the start.

The bad roads cause frequent punctures. A service fleet consisting of four motorcycles and four cars provides spares to riders regardless of team. Yves Hézard of Mavic the equipment company which provides the coverage, said:

Every year we change fewer wheels, because the wheels and tyres are getting better and better. We changed about 20 wheels today. Five years ago, it was much worse — we'd be changing about a hundred. Tyres are becoming much better than before. So, yes, our job is easier — except that the race generally goes faster now, so we're under a bit more pressure. Every year, there's new types of gears, new aluminium frames, new titanium frames, so it's getting more complex for us to offer neutral service. We have a list in the car of who is riding Mavic or Shimano or Campagnolo; the moment someone gets a flat tyre we need to think of a lot of things at once. Is it a titanium frame or a carbon frame or a steel frame?

Controversies

1907 – The wrong gendarme
In 1907, Georges Passerieu broke away from a small leading group just before Douai because he knew he could not outsprint them if they all finished together. He was chased all the way to Roubaix by a Belgian, Cyrille van Hauwaert, and tension in the velodrome was high. The crowd heard that Passerieu had reached the stadium but nobody rode on to the track. The leader was just about to ride in when a gendarme stepped into his path to check if his bicycle had the obligatory tax plate attached to it. Passerieu had already had a hard day and a shouting match broke out before he was allowed to continue.

1930 – The wrong team
In 1930, Jean Maréchal finished 24 seconds ahead of Belgian Julien Vervaecke but was moved to second because, while Maréchal was trying to pass Vervaecke, the Belgian tumbled into a ditch. According to some, Maréchal hit the Belgian's shoulder, causing his fall. Jacques Augendre, historian of the Tour de France, said Maréchal, who was 20, "was riding as an individual for a little bike-maker, Colin, and he got to Roubaix alone. His happiness was short-lived. Arbitrarily accused of having provoked a fall by Julien Vervaecke, with whom he had broken away, he was disqualified without any sort of hearing. Important detail: Vervaecke belonged to the all-powerful Alcyon team, run by the no less powerful Ludovic Feuillet (:fr: Ludovic Feuillet) ..."

1934 – The wrong bike
In 1934 Roger Lapébie was disqualified for changing bicycles. Second placed rider Gaston Rebry was awarded the victory once officials discovered that Lapébie's bike was missing a race sticker.

1936 – The wrong man
In 1936 the Belgian Romain Maes, appeared to win but judges declared Frenchman Georges Speicher the winner and Maes second. Shouting began in the stands and for a moment it looked as though fighting would start, but calm returned and the result was upheld. A Belgian may not have won but there were seven Belgians in the first ten.

1949 – The wrong route
The result in 1949 took several months and two international conferences to sort out. André Mahé was first but his win was challenged because he took the wrong course. Mahé was in a break of three that reached Roubaix velodrome in the lead, but he was misdirected by officials and entered the track by the wrong gate. Mahé was declared winner but a few minutes later other riders arrived using the correct route and Serse Coppi, brother of famous Fausto, won the sprint for what was assumed to be the minor placings. After a protest and several months, Serse Coppi was named joint winner with Mahé. Mahé said in 2007:

C'est trop bête d'en parler (It's too stupid to talk about). There was a break. Coppi attacked. His brother Fausto gave him a push to get him away. He wanted his brother to win. I waited a bit and then I attacked and I caught him and the break. Then I went off by myself. I was going to win Paris–Roubaix. At the entrance to the vélodrome, there were crowds everywhere, blocking the way. I looked around for where to go and I was directed round the outside wall of the track, to where the team cars had to park. It wasn't like nowadays, when there's television and everything. Then it was more chaotic and the whole road was blocked. People said I should have known the way into the track. But how do you know a thing like that at the end of Paris–Roubaix, when you've raced all day over roads like that? A gendarme signalled the way to go and that's the way I went.

It was a journalist on a motorbike who managed to get up to me. He was shouting 'Not that way! Not that way!' And I turned round in the road and I rode back beneath the outside wall of the grandstand and I saw a gateway that went into the track, a gateway for journalists. And that's the way I went, except that it came out on the other side of the track from the proper entrance. The bunch came in and Serse won the sprint. But then his brother told Serse to go to the judges to object. He told Serse that I hadn't ridden the entire and precise course and that therefore I should be déclassé. But that was below him. Coppi wanted his brother to have a big victory. He was a great champion, Coppi, but to do what he did, to protest like that to get a victory for his brother, that wasn't dignified for a champion. That was below him. A champion like that should never have stooped that low. I never spoke to him about it. Never did. Why should I?

1981 – The wrong race
In 1981 Bernard Hinault said after winning the race:

The only other times he rode it were in 1980, when he finished fourth, and in 1982, as the defending champion. When he was criticised, he said: "I don't go into offices and tell people to work harder, yet people ask me to be the strongest on the cobbles." Hinault fell seven times in that race, including 13 km from the finish when a small black dog called Gruson ran out in a bend and ran under his wheel. Hinault had been clear with Roger De Vlaeminck, Hennie Kuiper and Marc Demeyer. The incident made Hinault angry and he raced back to the others and won in Roubaix.

He was not the first star to refuse. Jacques Anquetil called it a lottery after puncturing 13 km from the end in 1958 and never took it seriously again.

In 2002 only two of the top 20 riders in the UCI table – Jens Voigt and Erik Zabel – were on the start line. The following year only Zabel was there. In 2004 he had stayed at home as well. Philippe Brunel wrote in L'Équipe:

We won't go as far as say that the five-time winner of the Tour [Hinault] – who every year gives the winner his celebration cobble stone on behalf of the organisers — has contributed to the impoverishment [paupérisation] of the queen of classics, which would offend him, but his words have contributed to the snub, or the indifference, of those who stay away. The fact isn't new but the phenomenon is getting worse and is concerning. The peloton of stayaways has grown to the point where Paris–Roubaix is now only for a tight group of specialists... especially the Belgians, capable of maintaining high speed on the cobbles.

1988 – The wrong place and time

The 1988 race contained a rare spectacle, for the first time in 30 years an early morning breakaway group held on until the finish: 27 kilometres into the race a group of unknown riders broke away and the pack did nothing to chase them down throughout the race. It was on a section of cobblestones outside Roubaix that Thomas Wegmüller (SUI) and Dirk Demol (BEL) broke away from the lead group to try for the victory. Wegmüller was ranked 175th in the world, Demol was a factory worker, ranked just inside the top 500 cyclists. As if the success of the breakaway wasn't enough, Paris–Roubaix was about to deliver a cruel irony.

When the two entered Roubaix, Wegmüller ran over a plastic bag that flew out in front of him, which became jammed in his derailleur. Wegmüller was unable to change gears which was crucial for a sprint finish. Demol could have attacked at this moment and won the race with ease, but it was clear he did not want to win in this manner and drafted behind Wegmüller as he got assistance from his team car to remove the bag. They removed most of the bag, but some of it was still jammed and his gears still would not change. Knowing that a bicycle change would be suicidal to his chances, Wegmüller continued on his damaged bike; Demol continued to draft behind him. When it came down to the final sprint, Wegmüller could only watch as Demol easily sprinted ahead to take the victory.

Laurent Fignon finished third after a late breakaway from the chasing peloton. Sean Kelly, also part of the chase group containing the top riders in the world, crashed late in the race, after it was already decided the breakaway would not be caught and crossed the finish line with blood covering his face.

2006 – The wrong train
In 2006 Leif Hoste, Peter Van Petegem and Vladimir Gusev were disqualified for riding through a closed railway level crossing 10 km before the finish and just ahead of an approaching freight train. Fabian Cancellara won and Tom Boonen and Alessandro Ballan were given the remaining places on the podium.

Deaths
In the 2018 race, Michael Goolaerts (Vérandas Willems–Crelan) crashed after suffering a cardiac arrest 100 km into the race. A doctor attempted to resuscitate him on the spot. He was flown to hospital in Lille by helicopter for treatment. At 23:30 local time, his death was announced by his team.

Comments

Theo de Rooij
The American television channel CBS covered Paris–Roubaix in the 1980s. Theo de Rooij, a Dutchman, had been in a promising position to win the 1985 race but had then crashed, losing his chance of winning. Covered in mud, he offered his thoughts on the race to CBS' John Tesh after the race:

"It's a bollocks, this race!" said de Rooij. "You're working like an animal, you don't have time to piss, you wet your pants. You're riding in mud like this, you're slipping ... it's a pile of shit".

When then asked if he would start the race again, de Rooij replied:

"Sure, it's the most beautiful race in the world!"

Other observations
 "A Paris–Roubaix without rain is not a true Paris–Roubaix. Throw in a little snow as well, it's not serious." – Sean Kelly
 "Paris–Roubaix is a horrible race to ride but the most beautiful one to win." – Sean Kelly
 "Let me tell you, though — there's a huge difference between the Tour of Flanders and Paris–Roubaix. They're not even close to the same. In one, the cobbles are used every day by the cars, and kept up, and stuff like that. The other one — it's completely different ... The best I could do would be to describe it like this — they plowed a dirt road, flew over it with a helicopter, and then just dropped a bunch of rocks out of the helicopter! That's Paris–Roubaix. It's that bad — it's ridiculous." – Chris Horner

"This is a race that suits me when I'm having a good day. On the other hand, if you don't have the legs, this is the worst place you could possibly be." – Jo Planckaert, 2004
"It's a circus, and I don't want to be one of the clowns." – Chris Boardman (speaking before the start on British Eurosport).
"Everybody has his own story during the race. When I get back to the bus I will hear the stories of my teammates and some stories come together and I start to understand what happened. It's the beauty of the race." – Wout van Aert, 2022

Les Amis de Paris–Roubaix

Les Amis de Paris–Roubaix – the "friends" of the race – is an enthusiasts' group founded by Jean-Claude Vallaeys in 1983. It is based in France but open to members all over the world. It has its roots in the Paris–Roubaix Cyclo-Touriste of 1972. By 1982 there were 7,242 participants. There and at other events on the course, a petition calling for the cobbles to be saved gathered 10,000 signatures. Jean-Claude Valleys, Jean-François Pescheux and the Vélo-club de Roubaix, which Vallaeys founded in 1966, formed Les Amis de Paris–Roubaix in 1982 at a photo exhibition at the Maison du Nord-Pas de Calais in Paris.

Its aim was to find enough stretches of cobbled road to preserve the nature of the race. So many roads had been resurfaced that, as the organiser said, there was a risk that it would become a fast race on smooth roads won by sprinters rather than those who had fought through hell. Alain Bernard, who succeeded Vallaeys, says: "We have succeeded in that. Today, the association looks after the maintenance of these paths of legend, working with local administrations to preserve them. But alongside that, we also do other things to preserve the value of the race, building up an impressive collection of documents, holding exhibitions, honouring former winners, holding tours of the route."

Les Amis said in 2007 that it was too late to save the sector of Bersée, which was removed from the race because of its dangerous state in 2007, but restored two years later. The situation is becoming critical, it says, at the Pont Gibus at Wallers, at Mons-en-Pévèle, Pont Thibaut at Ennevelin, the pavé of the Duclos-Lassalle section at Cysoing, and at Camphin-en-Pévèle.

"Their disappearance would be a fatal blow to the Queen of Classics", says the association.

Les forçats du pavé

The weather is often bad for the riders; it is frequently worse for the forçats du pavé (literally 'convicts of the cobbles'), as they call themselves In March 2008, "Les Amis" published an account of their work thus:

Saturday 22 March: a cold wind sweeps the plain of Pévèle; alternating showers of hail, melted snow and cold rain. Not a day to venture outside... Nevertheless, at the foot of the Mons-en-Pévèle ridge, silhouettes busy themselves along the soaked cobble roadway. Backs bent against the gusts, they tirelessly scratch at the ground with primitive tools. Who are these dozen souls — A work-gang from a byegone era? Automatons? Treasure-hunters?
No, these are members of the "Amis de Paris Roubaix", trying to clean off the mud and crusted earth left on the cobbles by farm work. They are on an important section of Paris–Roubaix and, without their intervention, the greatest of cycling classics, due to be held in only a few days, will not be able to come through... And without these cobbled routes, the Paris–Roubaix would disappear, depriving the whole world of one of sport's most intense and gripping events. This they know, and they'll be back again the two weekends before the race, far from the media and officials who will soon bustle here.
The passion that drives them is much stronger than the bad weather. It has nothing to do with the current storms in the cycling world. These discreet servants of the "Queen of the Classics" have only one ambition — to clean the stones so that when the day comes for the champion to be crowned they can hold their cobbled trophy high.

Winners and records

Winners by year

Wins per country

Most individual victories

4 wins
  Roger De Vlaeminck (1972, 1974, 1975, 1977)
  Tom Boonen (2005, 2008, 2009, 2012)

3 wins

  Octave Lapize (1909, 1910, 1911)
  Gaston Rebry (1931, 1934, 1935)
  Rik Van Looy (1961, 1962, 1965)
  Eddy Merckx (1968, 1970, 1973)
  Francesco Moser (1978, 1979, 1980)
  Johan Museeuw (1996, 2000, 2002)
  Fabian Cancellara (2006, 2010, 2013)

2 wins (11)
  Maurice Garin (1897, 1898)
  Lucien Lesna (1901, 1902)
  Hippolyte Aucouturier (1903, 1904)
  Charles Crupelandt (1912, 1914)
  Henri Pélissier (1919, 1921)
  Georges Claes (1946, 1947)
  Rik Van Steenbergen (1948, 1952)
  Sean Kelly (1984, 1986)
  Marc Madiot (1985, 1991)
  Gilbert Duclos-Lassalle (1992, 1993)
  Franco Ballerini (1995, 1998)

Fastest editions

The record held by Peter Post, was set on the pre-1968 course, which contained far fewer cobbles.

Other records
 Most races completed by a rider – 16, by Raymond Impanis (1947–1963), Servais Knaven (1995–2010), and Mathew Hayman (2000–2001, 2003, 2005–2006, 2008–2018). – 15, Gilbert Duclos-Lassalle,
 Most races (completed and not completed) – 18, by Raymond Poulidor (1960–1977, best result: 5th in 1962)
 Oldest winner – Gilbert Duclos-Lassalle, 38 years and 8 months in 1993.
 Largest winning margin (postwar) – 5 minutes and 21 seconds, when Eddy Merckx beat Roger De Vlaeminck in 1970.
 Closest margin of victory – , between Eddy Planckaert and Steve Bauer in 1990.
 Slowest victory – 12 hours and 15 minutes, in 1919 when Henri Pélissier won on roads devastated by World War I.
 Longest victorious break – , by Dirk Demol in 1988.

Other cobbled races
Paris–Roubaix is sometimes compared to the other famous cobbled race, the Tour of Flanders in Belgium. Paris–Roubaix is flatter and has more difficult cobbles while the Tour of Flanders contains a series of hills, many on cobbles, like the Koppenberg or Kapelmuur.

In addition to Paris–Roubaix and the Tour of Flanders, called the cobbled classics, other spring races like Omloop Het Nieuwsblad and Gent–Wevelgem feature extensive cobbles.

Related events

The U23 Paris–Roubaix or Paris–Roubaix Espoirs is raced in the early summer.

The Paris–Roubaix Cyclo is organised by the Velo Club de Roubaix every other June. This allows amateurs to experience the cobbles, the finishing laps in the vélodrome, and the showers. There is a choice of three levels: 120 km, most of the cobbled sectors; 190 km all the cobbles; or the full 261 km. All finishers receive a small cobblestone on a wooden plinth.
The Paris–Roubaix Skoda Classic Challenge is organised the day before the pro race in April.

From 2021, Paris–Roubaix Femmes – a professional women's race in the UCI Women's World Tour – has been held on Saturday, with the men's race taking place on the Sunday. It follows the same terrain as the men's race, albeit over a shorter distance.

Notes

References

Bibliography
 Philippe Bouvet, Pierre Callewaert, Jean-Luc Gatellier, Laget Serge: Paris–Roubaix: A Journey Through Hell, VeloPress, 2007. The inside story of the race, its great riders, its traditions, and its secrets.
 Also in German: Paris–Roubaix. Die Hölle des Nordens. Delius Klasing, Bielefeld 2011, .

Further reading

External links

 
 

 
Cycle races in France
UCI ProTour races
Recurring sporting events established in 1896
1896 establishments in France
UCI Road World Cup races
UCI World Tour races
Classic cycle races
Cycling in Paris
Sport in Roubaix
Challenge Desgrange-Colombo races
Super Prestige Pernod races